Alphonse De Wette (1902–?) was a Belgian rower. He competed at the 1924 Summer Olympics in Paris with the men's coxed pair where they were eliminated in round one. He also competed at the 1928 Summer Olympics.

References

1902 births
Year of death missing
Belgian male rowers
Olympic rowers of Belgium
Rowers at the 1924 Summer Olympics
Rowers at the 1928 Summer Olympics
European Rowing Championships medalists
20th-century Belgian people